Senator Jolley may refer to:

Clark Jolley (born 1970), Oklahoma State Senate
John L. Jolley (1840–1926), South Dakota State Senate

See also
Russell Jolly (born 1955), Mississippi State Senate